Sport in the Falkland Islands is restricted by the islands' low, and generally scattered, population. Nonetheless, it has been able to send teams to the Commonwealth Games, and the Island Games.

The islands have produced one sportsman of note, Louis Baillon, who competed in the 1908 Summer Olympics in the field hockey team.

Race meetings are held from time to time during summer as horse riding is still a popular pastime.

A wide variety of sports are played in the Falkland Islands including: rugby union , Badminton, Clay pigeon, darts, karate, marathon, golf, inline hockey, netball, yachting, squash, tennis, table tennis, volleyball, kayaking, target shooting and the country's National Sport, Sheep shearing in which they have internal and external competitions, competing World Wide.

Because of the large British military presence, many games involve their players and teams. There is an annual MPC (MILITARY) vs Stanley (CIVILIAN) games.

The Falklands Islands Rifle Association dates back to the 1880s.

In 2019 the National Sports Council was formed to bring together the diverse sporting organisations under one group.

National football stadium

See also
 Falkland Islands national football team
 Falkland Islands Football League
 Rugby union in the Falkland Islands
 Falkland Islands cricket team
 Falkland Islands at the Commonwealth Games

External links and references
 Sport clubs in the Falkland Islands
 Cultural stuff – infrastructure, facilities and travel 
 Falkland Islands Overseas Games Association
 Falkland Islands Golf Club
Falkland Islands Hockey Association

 
Falkland Islands culture